The Friedrich Nietzsche Prize or Friedrich-Nietzsche-Preis is a German literary award named after Friedrich Nietzsche and awarded by the state of Saxony-Anhalt. It was first awarded in 1996 for a German-language essayistic or philosophical work. The Friedrich Nietzsche Prize is endowed with 15,000 euros. It is awarded by the Prime Minister of Saxony-Anhalt on the basis of proposals by an international jury.

The Friedrich Nietzsche Prize is one of the most highly endowed awards in Germany, awarded exclusively for philosophical and essayistic achievements.

The International Friedrich Nietzsche Prize replaces the Friedrich Nietzsche Prize awarded by the state of Saxony-Anhalt between 1996 and 2012.

Recipients

 1995 Eugenio Trías, Barcelona
 1996 Wolfgang Müller-Lauter, Berlin
 1998 , Basel
 2000 Rüdiger Safranski, Berlin
 2002 Marie-Luise Haase, Berlin and  Michael Kohlenbach, Basel
 2004 Durs Grünbein, Berlin
 2006 Silvio Vietta, Hildesheim
 2009 , Freiburg
 2012 Andreas Urs Sommer, Heidelberg
 2015 Martin Walser, Überlingen
 2017 , Zürich
 2019 Ágnes Heller, New York / Budapest
 2022 Bettina Stangneth, Hamburg

References

External links
 List of Award Winners

Friedrich Nietzsche
German non-fiction literary awards
Philosophy awards